Search for a Supermodel was a reality television series on Network Ten in Australia that aired from 2000 to 2002 where regional finalists competed for a contract with Ford Models. The winner of each series went on to compete in the international version of the show. The third series had both female and male contestants.

Series One (2000)

Contestants
Gillian Kellett
Sophie Barton
Gail Browne
Daniela Cristea
Alana Crossman
Francesca Elnaugh (winner)
Sara-Jane Herbert
Sarah Marie Kamoen
Jacqui Lawson
Michelle Lee
Silvana Lovin
Parris Maflin
Rebecca Bull
Deanna Margaritis
Amber McGrath
Genevieve McLeod
Belinda Melhuish
Kasia Ozog
Kathryn John
Adria Richardson
Amelie Sauvage
Cheryl Tay
Sophie Turner
Paula Vesely
Haldaana Wells
Sydney James
Sara Wuj
Tarryn Wilson
Tarin Mckimmie
Elouise Yantsch
Katie Linney
Kristy Warrick
Lauren Murray
Alice Webb
Shelley Dragun
Aliera French
Yin Chiew
(this is an incomplete list of contestants)

Series Two (2001)

Contestants
Akush Atar
Alysha Rowatt
Belinda Willsher
Emily Thorpe
Gemma Bidstrup (winner)
Gemma Johnson
Jessica Elsegood
Katie Lange
Kristji Powell
Laura Midalia
Pia Loyola (Pia Miller)
Shadae Magson
Tahnee O'Shaughnessy
Dragana Ljubicic
Laura Spalding

Series Three (2002)

Contestants

Female
Alex Venema
Amy Brookman
Anastasia Schrieder
Anna George
Emily Stone
Josephine Wilkins
Kate O'Connell
Kate Peck
Kerry Doyle (People's choice winner)
Nicole Trunfio (winner)
Ruby Brown
Tara Edwards
Tiah Eckhardt Tiah Delaney
Vanessa DellaBona

Male
David Genat (winner)
Justin Hogg
Justin Pearce
Mark Bendeli
Matthew Kopp
Michael Lavens
Ross Laurence
Ryan Sathre
Scott Hansen
Simon Pocock
Zen Crosby

References

See also
America's Next Top Model
Australia's Next Top Model

Network 10 original programming
Modeling-themed reality television series
2000 Australian television series debuts
2002 Australian television series endings